Rosenblatt v. Baer, 383 U.S. 75 (1966), was a United States Supreme Court case regarding the First Amendment to the United States Constitution.

Baer, a supervisor of a county recreation area, brought a civil libel claim in New Hampshire state court against the petitioner Rosenblatt.  The recreation area had been used primarily as a ski resort.  The column in question had criticized the fiscal management of the area by Baer, stating "What happened to all the money last year? and every other year?" Between the trial and an appeal brought by petitioner, the Court had decided New York Times Co. v. Sullivan, in which they held that a State cannot award damages to a public official for a defamatory falsehood relating to official conduct unless the official can show actual malice. The New Hampshire Supreme Court had affirmed the award in the original case.

Opinion of the Court 
In an 8–1 decision, the Court reversed the decision of the New Hampshire Supreme Court.  It argued that there was a probability that Baer was a public official and therefore would be required to show actual malice in the depictions presented by the newspaper.  It was left to the trial judge to decide whether Baer qualified as a public figure.

See also 
 New York Times Co. v. Sullivan
 Defamation

External links
 
 ACLU summary of the case

New Hampshire state case law
United States defamation case law
Ski areas and resorts in New Hampshire
United States Supreme Court cases
United States Supreme Court cases of the Warren Court
1966 in United States case law
Belknap County, New Hampshire